The 2005 NCAA Skiing Championships were contested at the Middlebury College Snow Bowl in Hancock, Vermont as part of the 52nd annual NCAA-sanctioned ski tournament to determine the individual and team national champions of men's and women's collegiate slalom and cross-country skiing in the United States.

Denver, coached by Kurt Smitz, won the team championship, the Pioneers' fourth co-ed title and seventeenth overall.

Venue
The championships were contested at Stowe Mountain Resort in Stowe, VT on the Hayride trail. University of Vermont served as hosts.

These were the tenth championships held in the state of Vermont.

Program

Men's events
 Cross country, 10 kilometer freestyle
 Cross country, 20 kilometer classical
 Slalom
 Giant slalom

Women's events
 Cross country, 5 kilometer freestyle
 Cross country, 15 kilometer classical
 Slalom
 Giant slalom

Team scoring

 DC – Defending champions
 Debut team appearance

See also
 List of NCAA skiing programs

References

2005 in sports in Vermont
NCAA Skiing Championships
2005 in alpine skiing
2005 in cross-country skiing
NCAA Skiing Championships
College sports in Vermont
Skiing in Vermont